Muthi Bhar Chahat is a Pakistani television drama series aired on Express Entertainment for 2019 television season. It is produced by Zaib Chaudhry and Farha Ali under banner Focus Entertainment, written by Suraj Baba, directed by Zaib Chaudhry and features Resham, Agha Ali and Usman Peerzada along with ensemble cast.

Cast
Resham as Tehzeeb: lawyer by profession, love interest of Hashim.
Agha Ali as Hashim Hayat: elder son of Sikandar Hayat, love interest of Tehzeeb.
Usman Peerzada as Chaudhry Sikandar Hayat: senior politician of Khushpur, Hashim and Daawar's father.
Saima Saleem as Begum: Hashim and Daawar's mother, Sikandar's wife.
Adnan Jilani as Wahaj Baig: an entrepreneur, Zartaj's husband, Harib and Beck's father, having an extra Marital affair with Rania.
Becks Khan as Becks aka Bakhtawar: Wahaj and Zartaj's daughter, Love interest of Zain.
Hareeb Farooq as Harib: Wahaj and Zartaj's son, love interest of Emaan.
Hammad Shoaib as Zain: a simple guy of middle-class family, love interest of Becks.
Huma Nawab as Safia: senior maid at Wahaj's place, Emaan's mother.
Zaib Chaudhry as Zartaj: a renowned politician, Wahaj's wife.
Humaira Zahid as Aashi: Zartaj's elite friend, Eshal's mother.
Rida Ali Ispahani as Rania: a singer by profession, involved in an affair with Wahaj.
Izzah Malik as Emaan: Safia's daughter, having feelings for Harib
Hammad Hussain as Daawar Hayat: a spoilt brat and younger son of Sikandar Hayat.
Zahid Qureshi as Aagha Jaan: Tehzeeb's father
Subhan Awan as Umair: Harib's friend
Sheraaz Sikandar as Usama: Eshal's stepbrother, want to marry Emaan.
Mariam Tiwana as Eshal: love interest of Harib.
Asad Butt as Haider: Emaan's cousin with whom Safia want to marry her.
Javed Jamal as Dilawar: Safia's brother, Haider's father.
Momina Batool as Nida: Tehzeeb's friend.
Waleed Mirza as Qaadir: Hashim and Daawar's cousin.
Saima Kanwal as Zareena: Haider's mother.
Mehwish Nawab as Naazi: Emaan's friend.
Afzal Behram Khan as Tipu: Zain's friend.
Akhtar Ghazali as Zain's father.
Salma Qadir as Zain's mother.

Guest Appearance
Arsalan Khan as Asghar: Tehzeeb's client.
Javeria Nayyar as Bilqees: Safia's friend, a match maker.
Anjum Hussain as Anjum: Nida's brother.
Masood Akhtar as Judge: judge in charge of case against Daawar Hayat.
Saleem Khan as Tahir: Rania's past love interest.

References

2019 Pakistani television series debuts
2019 Pakistani television series endings